Kalinga TV is an Odia language 24-hour cable and satellite news channel in Bhubaneswar, Odisha, India. The channel was launched in April 2015 by Kalinga Media and Entertainment, a unit of KIIT Group of Institutions.

It is classified as Indian Non-Government Company and is registered at Registrar of Companies, Bhubaneswar.

See also
List of Odia-language television channels
List of television stations in India

References

External links

Odia-language television channels
Television channels and stations established in 2015
Television stations in Bhubaneswar
Companies based in Bhubaneswar
2015 establishments in Odisha